Pseudargyra is a genus of flies in the family Dolichopodidae.

Species
Pseudargyra cornuta Van Duzee, 1930
Pseudargyra fuscipennis Van Duzee, 1930
Pseudargyra magnicornis (Van Duzee, 1930)
Pseudargyra tarsalis (Van Duzee, 1930)

References

Dolichopodidae genera
Diptera of South America